An aire de mise en valeur de l'architecture et du patrimoine (also AVAP or AMVAP) is a French urban planning regulation built and spatial heritage. The law creating the AMVAP was passed on July 12, 2010 with the Grenelle II law. To this date, they will replace the zones de protection du patrimoine architectural, urbain et paysager, and older ones will be replaced before July 14, 2015.

References 

Law of France
Urban planning in France